Donja Mutnica is a village in Serbia. It is located in the municipality of Paraćin and Pomoravlje District. According to 2002 census it had 1051 inhabitants which is significant drop from 1991 census when 1373 inhabitants were registered.

Etymology 
Village's name is composed of two words; word Donja literally translates as Lower and is used to distinguish between two neighbouring villages - Donja Mutnica and Gornja Mutnica (Gornja translates as Higher). Second word Mutnica is derived from word Mutna which literally translates as Muddy but Sinister would be a more meaningful translation considering unusual historical circumstances through which village got its name.

History 
Going back to the 14th century, in between present-day villages Donja Mutnica and Gornja Mutnica was a former village by the name Zlatica.

References 
 Mutnica.net / Village Name
 Paracin-Online.com / Donja Mutnica
 Popis stanovništva, domaćinstava i Stanova 2002. Knjiga 1: Nacionalna ili etnička pripadnost po naseljima. Statistical Office of Serbia. 2003..

Populated places in Pomoravlje District